Andrew Cooper (born 1964) is an Australian Olympic rower.

Andrew Cooper may also refer to:

Andrew Cooper (actor) (born 1981), British model and actor from The Royals
 Andrew W. Cooper (1927–2002), civil rights activist and journalist
 Andrew F. Cooper (born 1950), Canadian academic
 Andrew Cooper III, modelling pseudonym of actor Sam J. Jones (born 1954)
 Andrew Cooper, Baron Cooper of Windrush (born 1963), British Conservative politician
 Andrew Ian Cooper, British chemist
 Andrew Cooper (The Inbetweeners), fictional character from The Inbetweeners

See also
 Andy Cooper (1898–1941), American baseball player